Richard Warren Joseph Hayman (March 27, 1920 – February 5, 2014) was an American musician who was the chief music arranger of the Boston Pops Orchestra for over 50 years, and served as a pops conductor for orchestras including the Detroit Symphony Orchestra, the St. Louis Symphony and the Grand Rapids Symphony in Grand Rapids, Michigan.

He toured and recorded as a harmonica player and made dozens of recordings for Mercury Records as "Richard Hayman and His Orchestra." His biggest hit was a single, "Ruby," from the 1952 film Ruby Gentry, starring Jennifer Jones and Charlton Heston. Hayman's arrangement featured himself as harmonica soloist. Over a lengthy career, he created musical arrangements for more than 50 artists and entertainers including Barbra Streisand, Bob Hope, Liza Minnelli and Olivia Newton-John.

Career 
A native of Cambridge, Massachusetts, United States, Hayman's career in music began in his teen years as a player and arranger for the Borrah Minnevitch Harmonica Rascals. In the 1940s, he became an arranger for Metro-Goldwyn-Mayer studios doing arrangements (often uncredited) for such MGM films as Girl Crazy, Meet Me in St. Louis and Thousands Cheer. From 1945 to 1950, he was musical director for the Vaughn Monroe Orchestra.

In the 1950s and 1960s, Hayman recorded a series of albums for Mercury Records. His 1957 outing Havana In Hi-Fi, was first in the label's pop music stereo LP series (SR 60000).

Hayman is most famous for having been the principal arranger at the Boston Pops Orchestra for over 30 years where his award-winning arrangements are still used today. He occasionally guest-conducted there, and when Arthur Fiedler had a time conflict with his job as pops conductor for the Detroit Symphony Orchestra, he recommended Hayman for the post.

Hayman was also closely affiliated with the St. Louis Symphony Orchestra for over 30 years. Known for his sequined jackets, harmonica solos, and corny jokes, he became its Principal Pops Conductor in 1976, leading both the Pops at Powell and Queeny Park concerts. Queeny Pops, with concertgoers seated at tables in the acoustically atrocious but centrally located (in the suburbs of west St. Louis County) Greensfelder Field House, was a hit for many years, and made it possible for the SLSO to offer its musicians a full 52-week annual contract.

That ended when a financial crunch in 2001, coinciding with a realization that the SLSO's pops concerts had not changed with the times, led to the cancellation of the Queeny Pops series and a marked reduction in overall pops concerts by the orchestra.

In 1985, he was appointed Principal Pops Conductor of the Grand Rapids Symphony, serving more than 21 seasons until his retirement in 2006 after which he was named Pops Conductor Laureate. Hayman founded and conducted the Florida Sunshine Pops orchestra in Boca Raton and continued to make guest conducting appearances in the United States and Europe.

His biggest hit was the 1953 single "Ruby". Hayman took the theme for the motion picture Ruby Gentry, and through his specially stylized arrangement, utilizing a harmonica as the solo instrument with a large, quasi-symphonic orchestra, the song zoomed to the top of the hit parade all over the world and brought about a renewed interest in the harmonica. It should also be mentioned that the flip side of the 45rpm and 78rpm single hit "Ruby" was the hit "Dansero" which also became an international hit.

He continued to chart into the early 1960s with titles such as "Night Train".

Hayman's last event with the St. Louis Symphony Orchestra, where he held the title of Pops Conductor Emeritus, took place on June 27, 2010, to honor his 90th birthday. The St. Louis Metro Singers, who performed with him at many Pops concerts, were also on stage at the event.

Hayman is also noted for albums now regarded as Exotica.

Death
Hayman died at a hospice in New York on February 5, 2014. He was 93.

Discography

As conductor

As arranger

References

Notes

Inline citations

External links

[ Richard Hayman] at AllMusic

1920 births
2014 deaths
20th-century American composers
20th-century American conductors (music)
21st-century American composers
21st-century American conductors (music)
American harmonica players
American male composers
American male conductors (music)
American music arrangers
Easy listening musicians